John Foruria (November 26, 1944 – May 3, 2017) was an American football defensive back. He played for the Pittsburgh Steelers from 1967 to 1968.

He died on May 3, 2017, in Emmett, Idaho at age 72.

References

1944 births
2017 deaths
American football defensive backs
Idaho Vandals football players
Pittsburgh Steelers players
People from Emmett, Idaho